Epicrocis anthracanthes is a species of snout moth in the genus Epicrocis. It was described by Edward Meyrick in 1934 and is known from Cyprus.

References

Moths described in 1934
Phycitini
Endemic arthropods of Cyprus
Moths of Europe